Euzophera nessebarella is a species of snout moth in the genus Euzophera. It was described by Soffner in 1962. It is found in Bulgaria and Greece.

References

Moths described in 1962
Phycitini
Moths of Europe